Cefa is a commune in Bihor County, Crișana, Romania with a population of 2,272 people (2011). It is composed of three villages: Ateaș (Atyás), Cefa and Inand (Inánd). It also included five other villages until 2003, when they were split off to form Gepiu and Sânnicolau Român Communes.

The oldest attested name of Cefa is Chepha (1302).

References

Cefa
Localities in Crișana